Minsaram is a 2011 Indian Tamil language vigilante film directed by N. Selvakumaran. The film stars Yuvaraj, Madhuchanda, and Thol. Thirumavalavan, with Ajay Pradeep, Adith, Kannan, Babu, Sougandhi, Muthuswamy, Rajendranath, Bala Singh, Rama, Kadhal Sukumar, and Nellai Siva playing supporting roles. The film, produced by M. S. Tamilarasan and Palani M. Eliyas, had musical score by T. Devan and was released on 18 March 2011.

Plot
A mysterious group kidnaps a politician, an advocate, a businessman, and a police officer. The Chief Minister of Tamil Nadu, Thamizharasan (Thol. Thirumavalavan), pressures the police to find the culprits. Ilavarasu (Yuvaraj), the leader of the group, contacts Thamizharasan via email and tells him why he had to kidnap them.

Ilavarasu was a carefree student who lived with his parents and his sister Jaya. One day, Raghava, the brother of the local don Kottai Kumaraswamy (Muthuswamy), and his friends eve-teased and molested Jaya in a shop. Ilavarasu and his friends caught them and took them to the police station. Raghava and his friends were then sent to jail. A vengeful Kumaraswamy threatened Ilavarasu's family and made their lives miserable. Ilavarasu's father sought the help of ACP Venkatesh (Rajendranath) and filed a complaint against Kumaraswamy, but Venkatesh, being  Kumaraswamy's loyal man, threw away his complaint. Kumaraswamy's henchmen continued to tease Jaya, and one day, Ilavarasu and his friends beat them up. One of the rowdies died during the fight. Kumaraswamy's henchmen then kidnapped Ilavarasu's family, and Kumaraswamy brutally killed them. The journalist Kathir (Sougandhi), Ilavarasu's girlfriend Aarthi (Madhuchanda), and his four friends (Ajay Pradeep, Adith, Kannan and Babu) decided to help Ilavarasu.

Back to the present, Thamizharasan feels bad for what happened to Ilavarasu and wants to help him. The next day, on live television, Ilavarasu and his friends introduce the hostages: corrupt politicians, corrupt police officers, corrupt advocates, fraudster businessmen, and rowdies. They beg Thamizharasan to fight against social evils like corruption and rowdyism and ask him to abolish bail. The public strongly supports the students and their request. Thamizharasan also decides to support the students. He asks them to release the hostages and promises to clear them. When Thamizharasan went to see the governor, his car exploded, and on the news, he is pronounced dead. At the headquarters of Thamizharasan's party, the politicians have a savage fight on who will be the next leader of the party, and the governor dismisses the current government.

A few months later, Thamizharasan returns alive just before the election. Thamizharasan tells the media that he was saved by the students that day and they were protecting him from the people who tried to kill him. With the support of the students, Thamizharasan is re-elected as chief minister, and he finally abolishes bail.

Cast

Yuvaraj as Ilavarasu
Madhuchanda as Aarthi
Thol. Thirumavalavan as Thamizharasan
Ajay Pradeep as Ajay, Ilavarasu's friend
Adith as Ilavarasu's friend
Kannan as Ilavarasu's friend
Babu as Ilavarasu's friend
Sougandhi as Kathir
Muthuswamy as Kottai Kumaraswamy
Rajendranath as ACP Venkatesh
Bala Singh as Sundaramoorthy, Ilavarasu's father
Rama as Ilavarasu's mother
Kadhal Sukumar as Ilavarasu's friend
Nellai Siva as Thooyavan
Myna Nandhini as Jaya's friend
Kovai Senthil as Tamil Professor
Anju as Minister
Lollu Sabha Balaji as Thamizharasan's assistant
Selvakumar as Politician
Nivetha as Nivetha
Suraj
R. S. Nathan
Imran
Kavita Banerjee
Rekha
Nagu Pinky in a special appearance
Gana Ulaganathan in a special appearance
Sujibala in a special appearance

Production
After producing the film 18 Vayasu Puyale (2007), the producers decided to make a film about the student's power. N. Selvakumaran made his directorial debut with this film. Newcomer Yuvaraj and Madhuchanda were chosen to play the lead roles. Thol. Thirumavalavan, the leader of the political party Viduthalai Chiruthaigal Katchi, was cast to play the role of Chief Minister of Tamil Nadu and had also penned the lyrics for a song in this film.

Soundtrack

The film score and the soundtrack were composed by T. Devan. The soundtrack, released in 2009, features 7 tracks with lyrics written by Thol. Thirumavalavan, Muthu Vijayan, Shanmuga Seelan, Vaanavan and T. Devan.

Release
The film was released on 18 March 2011 alongside Muthukku Muthaaga, Avargalum Ivargalum and Lathika.

Rohit Ramachandran rated the film 0.5 out of 5 and said, "if you're looking for entertainment or art, you'll be disappointed. It is a two-hour long electoral campaign of Thol. Thirumavalavan" and concluded, "Minsaram lacks vitality and fails to secure your vote". Dinamalar praised the dialogue delivery of Thol. Thirumavalavan and the song sang by Gana Ulaganathan but criticised the writing and the direction.

References

2011 films
2010s Tamil-language films
Indian vigilante films
2011 directorial debut films